The 1931 Chicago Maroons football team was an American football team that represented the University of Chicago during the 1931 college football season. In their 40th season under head coach Amos Alonzo Stagg, the Maroons compiled a 3–7–1 record, finished in eighth place in the Big Ten Conference, and were outscored by their opponents by a combined total of 130 to 71.

Schedule

References

Chicago
Chicago Maroons football seasons
Chicago Maroons football